The Horta of Valencia is a historical comarca and urban area of Valencian Community. The Horta of Valencia consists of Valencia and three comarcas: Horta Nord, Horta Sud, Horta Oest.

Demography 
It is the most populated region of País Valencià. The Horta of Valencia experienced the largest increase in population, especially as an immigrant receiver. Its urban expansion has motivated the creation of several urbanisations, and the incorporation to the urban nucleus of the metropolis of the earlier towns. Nowadays, the expansion has also contributed to its separation in four regions that are currently considered sub-regions.

Geography 
The region is located within Puçol (in the North), the Albufera (in the South), and Paterna, Torrent and Montcada (in the West). It is a lowland region that elevates progressively from the sea towards the inland.

The Horta at the Territory of Valencia
People preserve the Valencian agricultural traditions near the city of Valencia, and there are traditional cabins for agricultural purposes, called barraques, as well as the traditional paths along the Horta, even if the city has caused negative effects because of the building of many landfills, waste ground, and workshops. This situation, together with the construction of new high-speed rails and dual carriageways, has cut up the Horta into different parts. Also, it has left little areas of countryside surrounded by huge infrastructures. That is a problem that has an impact not only in farmers' lives, but also in neighbours'.

Here is a list of the different areas in the territory of Valencia:

Horta of Campanar

The Horta of Campanar is located in the North West of the Campanar district. In the north, it shares its border with the dual carriageway that connects Valencia and Paterna. In the west, it is in front of Horta of Paterna, and in the south, it borders with Horta of Quart de Poblet, Mislata and the river Turia. In the east, it shares border with Ronda Nord of Valencia and the neighbourhoods of Beniferri and Campanar.

Horta of Faitanar

The Horta of Faitanar is the section of Horta of Valencia that is located in the south of the new river bed of the Turia River and in the west of Forn d'Alcedo. In the south, it borders with Picanya and Paiporta, and in the north-west, it is in front of Xirivella where the Horta continues without cracking.

Horta of the Moreres or of the Punta

The Horta of the Moreres, or the Horta of the Punta, belongs to the farmland of the towns La Font de Sant Lluis, La Font d'Encorts, La Punta and Natzaret. It extends its territory from Ronda Sud and the City of Arts and Sciences to the new river bed of the Turia River.

Horta of the Castellar-l'Oliveral

In the neighbourhood of Castellar-l'Oliveral, there is a territory of the Horta between the new river bed of the Turia River and Sedaví.

Horta of Vera

The Horta of Vera is the ancient Horta of Benimaclet and Alboraya. Nowadays, the south belongs to Valencia and the north to Alboraya. A great part of it has been urbanised and transformed into the neighbourhoods of Camí of Vera and Vega Baixa. In the north, there are still some farmlands and barraques.

Horta of Orriols

In the north of the neighbourhoods of Orriols (previously, a village) and of Sant Llorenç, between the limit of Alboraia and Ronda Nord of Valencia, Horta of Orriols lives on and continues all along until the city of Alboraia.

Horta of Pobles del Nord

Thanks to the isolation from the big cities, big areas of the Horta live on in the region of Pobles del Nord.

Pinedo and El Palmar

Although almost all the land is dedicated to the cultivation of rice, a significant number barraques and other elements related to the Horta, such as ditches, live on in the villages of Pinedo and El Palmar.

Origin

The Valencian Horta came up in the time of the Roman Empire. The city of Valentia was founded as the logistics centre and the hibernation place for the Roman campaigns for the conquest of the Iberia.

The Romans contributed to these lands with the crops they knew, such as the cultivation of cereals, olive, or vine. Nevertheless, on account of the typical conditions of the environment, the crops were not productive enough. Still, the crops were useful in supplying the Roman armies and, later, for the campaigns of the Visigoths, who left the fields and the city.

The Valencian Horta was developed in the medieval times, during the Islamic period. An important fluvial infrastructure was created, mainly thanks to the construction of ditches and assuts (little dams that led the waters of the Turia River and the precipices that could drain marshy areas and bring down the watering to the fields). Likewise, different activities were boosted and developed near those infrastructures, such as the watermills, which profited the water flow of the ditches and the washbasins near the houses and farmsteads.

Thanks to those infrastructures, the city of Valencia, as well as its surrounding villages, was able to expand successfully.

A rich production area was created. The origin of Horta of Valencia comes from the Al-Alandalus period, as a consequence of the introduction of the Arabic irrigation tradition (Yemen and Syria), just like the North African berbers did. The cultivations were unequal, due to an independent and tributary society. In addition to the typical crops of the Roman period (cereal, vine, olive), the rice and the tiger nut (Cyperus esculentus) and new vegetables from Al-Andalus, such as aubergines and artichokes. Those new crops are typical from the damp zones. The crops par excellence are the horticultural products, hence the name of this environment.

(See also: ,)
Except for Montcada, the rest are ruled by the Water Tribunal of the plain of Valencia, which is an institution than [GRAM] controls the use and the utilisation of the irrigation flow. This institution is still working nowadays, and its members assemble at the door of the Valencia Cathedral once a week. The Historical Irrigation System at l'Horta de València was named a Globally Important Agricultural Heritage Site in 2019.

Economy

Agriculture 
In the typical Mediterranean climate, the Horta has mild winters and very hot summers. The historical activity of the region had been agriculture, with a predominance of three types of crops: orange, vegetables and rice. The watering system is structured around 13 ditches that allow irrigation of crops all year. Some municipal areas have a certain expertise regarding crops: tiger nuts in Alboraya and Almàssera; tomatoes and peppers for canning El Puig, Puçol and Tavernes Blanques; strawberries in Rafelbunyol; melons and watermelons in Meliana and Almàssera, and so on. Rice is distressed, but it is still being cultivated on the edges of the Albufera.

Industry 
To the west of the region, towns are situated on the edge of the Horta, around the capital city: Montcada, with textile and fireworks industries; Burjassot, together with Godella, with ceramic and cement factories; Paterna, Manises and Quart de Poblet, which have an important ceramic industry; Mislata, which presents paper and textile industries, and so on. In the north, the towns follow a parallel line to the coast: Tavernes Blanques, with ceramic and porcelain industries; Massamagrell, Meliana, Puçol, basically agricultural, etc. In the south, there are several towns physically attached to each other: Benetússer, Alfafar, Poblenou de la Corona, Sedaví, Massanassa, Catarroja and Silla. The capital city of the region, Valencia, which is also that of País Valencià with more than 760 000 inhabitants, currently maintains the agriculture that made it famous in the past, but it has also developed a lot of industry (furniture, chemical, mechanical) and trade.

References

Sources
 
 Sala Giner, Daniel. 2007. La milenaria Acequia de Mislata. Javier Boronat (ed.). Valencia. 183 pages.
 
 

Geography of Valencia
Comarques of the Valencian Community
Globally Important Agricultural Heritage Systems